This I Know is the fourth studio album by American Christian singer and songwriter Kim Boyce. It would be her final album on the Myrrh label released in 1990. Christian singer/songwriter Tim Miner, who co-wrote and produced the track "Tender Heart" from her 1989 album Love Is You to Me handles the production duties on this album. Boyce duets with her husband Gary Koreiba on the song "True Love" and also dedicates the album to him. Songwriting contributions provided by Miner, Cindy Cruse and Amy Grant. The album's first CHR/Pop single and music video "Good Enough" incorporates the traditional Gospel song "Old-Time Religion." This I Know peaked at number 15 on the Top Christian Albums chart.

Track listing

Charts

Radio singles

References

1990 albums
Kim Boyce albums
Myrrh Records albums
Word Records albums